Carmen Simion (born May 5, 1970) is a Romanian sprint canoer who competed in the early 1990s. She won a bronze medal in the K-2 5000 m event at the 1993 ICF Canoe Sprint World Championships in Copenhagen.

Simion also at the 1992 Summer Olympics in Barcelona, finishing fourth in both the K-2 500 m and the K-4 500 m events.

References

Sports-reference.com profile

1970 births
Canoeists at the 1992 Summer Olympics
Living people
Olympic canoeists of Romania
Romanian female canoeists
ICF Canoe Sprint World Championships medalists in kayak